This is a list of high schools, either currently open, closed, or planned to open in the future, in the U.S. state of Tennessee.

Anderson County
Oak Ridge High School, Oak Ridge

Clinton

Anderson County High School
Clinton High School

Bedford County

Central High School, Shelbyville
Community High School, Unionville
Webb School, Bell Buckle
Cascade High School, Wartrace

Benton County

Big Sandy K-12 School, Big Sandy
Camden Central High School, Camden

Bledsoe County
Bledsoe County High School, Pikeville

Blount County
Alcoa High School, Alcoa

Maryville

Eagleton College and Career Academy
Heritage High School
Maryville High School
William Blount High School

Bradley County
Walker Valley High School, Charleston

Cleveland

Bradley Central High School
Cleveland High School
Tennessee Christian Preparatory School
United Christian Academy

Campbell County

Campbell County High School, Jacksboro
Jellico High School, Jellico

Cannon County
Cannon County High School, Woodbury

Carroll County

Clarksburg High School, Clarksburg
Hollow Rock-Bruceton Central High School, Bruceton
Huntingdon High School, Huntingdon
McKenzie High School, McKenzie
West Carroll Jr/Sr High School, Atwood

Carter County

Cloudland High School, Roan Mountain
Hampton High School, Hampton
Unaka High School, Hunter

Elizabethton

Elizabethton High School
Happy Valley High School

Cheatham County

Cheatham County High School, Ashland City
Harpeth High School, Kingston Springs

Pleasant View

Pleasant View Christian School
Sycamore High School

Chester County
Chester County High School, Henderson

Claiborne County
Claiborne High School, Tazewell (replaces Claiborne County High School)

Harrogate

J. Frank White Academy
Cumberland Gap High School

Clay County
Clay County High School, Celina

Cocke County

Cocke County High School, Newport
Cosby High School, Cosby

Coffee County

Coffee County Central High School, Manchester
Tullahoma High School, Tullahoma

Crockett County
Crockett County High School, Alamo

Cumberland County

Crossville

Cumberland County High School
Stone Memorial High School
The Phoenix School

Davidson County

Nashville Christian School, Bellevue
Metro Christian Academy, Goodlettsville
Whites Creek High School, Whites Creek

Antioch

Antioch High School
Ezell-Harding Christian School

Madison

Goodpasture Christian School
Madison Academy

Nashville

Public

Academy at Old Cockrill
Cane Ridge High School
Early College High School
East Nashville Magnet High School
Glencliff High School
Hillsboro High School
Hillwood Comprehensive High School
Hume-Fogg High School
Hunters Lane High School
John Overton Comprehensive High School
KIPP Nashville Collegiate High School
Knowledge Academies
LEAD Southeast High School
Martin Luther King Magnet at Pearl High School
Maplewood Comprehensive High School
McGavock High School
Nashville Big Picture High School
Nashville School of the Arts
Pearl-Cohn Comprehensive High School
RePublic High School
Stratford High School
Valor College Prep

Private

Christ Presbyterian Academy
Davidson Academy
Donelson Christian Academy
The Ensworth School
Father Ryan High School
Franklin Road Academy
Harpeth Hall School
Lipscomb Academy
Montgomery Bell Academy
St. Cecilia Academy
University School of Nashville

Decatur County
Riverside High School, Decaturville

DeKalb County
DeKalb County High School, Smithville

Dickson County

Creek Wood High School, Charlotte
Dickson County High School, Dickson

Dyer County

 Dyer County High School, Newbern
 Dyersburg High School, Dyersburg

Fayette County
Rossville Christian Academy, Rossville

Somerville

Fayette Ware Comprehensive High School
Fayette Academy

Fentress County

Alvin C. York Institute, Jamestown
Clarkrange High School, Clarkrange

Franklin County

Franklin County High School, Winchester
St. Andrew's-Sewanee School, Sewanee
Huntland K-12 School, Huntland

Gibson County

Bradford High School, Bradford
Gibson County High School, Dyer
Humboldt High School, Humboldt
Milan High School, Milan
Peabody High School, Trenton
South Gibson County High School, Medina

Giles County

Giles County High School, Pulaski
Richland High School, Lynnville

Grainger County

Grainger High School, Rutledge (replaced Rutledge HS)
Washburn High School, Washburn

Greene County

Chuckey-Doak High School, Afton
Greeneville High School, Greeneville
North Greene High School, Baileyton
South Greene High School, South Greene
West Greene High School, Mosheim

Grundy County
Grundy County High School, Coalmont

Hamblen County

Morristown

Morristown-Hamblen High School East
Morristown-Hamblen High School West

Hamilton County

 Chattanooga Central High School, Harrison
Collegedale Academy, Collegedale
Red Bank High School, Red Bank
Sale Creek High School, Sale Creek
Signal Mountain High School, Signal Mountain

Chattanooga

Baylor School
Brainerd High School
Boyd Buchanan High School
Chattanooga Christian School
Chattanooga High School Center for Creative Arts
Chattanooga School for the Arts and Sciences
Chattanooga Collegiate High School
East Ridge High School
Girls Preparatory School
Grace Academy
Hamilton Heights Christian Academy
Howard School of Academics and Technology
Lookout Valley Middle High School
The McCallie School
Notre Dame High School
Silverdale Baptist Academy
Tyner Academy of Math, Science, & Technology (formerly known as Tyner High School)

Hixson

Berean Christian Academy
Hixson High School

Ooltewah

East Hamilton High School
Ooltewah High School

Soddy-Daisy

Sequoyah High School
Soddy Daisy High School

Hancock County
Hancock County Middle/High School, Sneedville

Hardeman County

 Bolivar Central High School, Bolivar
Middleton High School, Middleton

Hardin County

Savannah

Harbert Hills Academy
Hardin County High School

Hawkins County

 Cherokee Comprehensive High School, Rogersville
 Clinch Alternative School, Eidson
 Volunteer Comprehensive High School, Church Hill

Haywood County
Haywood High School, Brownsville

Henderson County

Lexington High School, Lexington
Scotts Hill High School, Reagan

Henry County
Henry County High School, Paris

Hickman County

Hickman County High School, Centerville
East Hickman High School, Lyles

Houston County
Houston County High School, Erin

Humphreys County

 McEwen High School, McEwen
 Waverly Central High School, Waverly

Jackson County
Jackson County High School, Gainesboro

Jefferson County

Jefferson County High School, Dandridge
Lakeway Christian Academy, White Pine

Johnson County
Johnson County High School, Mountain City

Knox County

Carter High School, Strawberry Plains
Farragut High School, Farragut
Gibbs High School, Corryton
Halls High School & North Knox Career/Tech Center, Halls Crossroads
Karns High School & Byington-Solway Career/Tech Center, Karns

Knoxville

Austin-East High School
Bearden High School
Berean Christian School (BCS)
Christian Academy of Knoxville (CAK)
Central High School
Dr. Paul L. Kelley Volunteer Academy
Fulton High School
Grace Christian Academy
Hardin Valley Academy
Knoxville Catholic High School
Knoxville Christian School
L&N STEM Academy
Lincoln Park Technology & Trade Center
Richard Yoakley Alternative School
Ridgedale Alternative School
South-Doyle High School
Tennessee Governor's Academy (TGA)
Tennessee School for the Deaf
Webb School of Knoxville
West High School

Powell

Powell High School
Temple Baptist Academy

Lake County
Lake County High School, Tiptonville

Lauderdale County

Halls High School, Halls
Ripley High School, Ripley

Lawrence County

Lawrence County High School, Lawrenceburg
Loretto High School, Loretto
Summertown High School, Summertown

Lewis County
Lewis County High School, Hohenwald

Lincoln County

Fayetteville

Fayetteville High School
Lincoln County High School

Loudon County

Greenback K-12 School, Greenback
Lenoir City High School, Lenoir City
Loudon High School, Loudon

Macon County

Macon County High School, Lafayette
Red Boiling Springs High School, Red Boiling Springs

Madison County

Jackson

Jackson Central-Merry High School
Jackson Christian School
Liberty Technology Magnet High School
Madison Academic Magnet High School
North Side High School
Sacred Heart of Jesus High School
South Side High School
Trinity Christian Academy
University School of Jackson
West Tennessee School for the Deaf

Marion County

Marion County High School, Jasper
Whitwell High School, Whitwell

South Pittsburg

Richard Hardy Memorial School
South Pittsburg High School

Marshall County

Cornersville High School, Cornersville
Forrest High School, Chapel Hill
Marshall County High School, Lewisburg

Maury County

Culleoka K-12 School, Culleoka
Hampshire K-12 School, Hampshire
Mount Pleasant High School, Mount Pleasant
Santa Fe K-12 School, Santa Fe

Columbia

Columbia Academy
Columbia Central High School
Spring Hill High School
Zion Christian Academy

McMinn County
McMinn Central High School, Englewood

Athens

McMinn County High School
Fairview Christian Academy
Christ Legacy Academy

McNairy County

Adamsville High School, Adamsville
McNairy Central High School, Selmer

Meigs County
Meigs County High School, Decatur

Monroe County

Sequoyah High School, Madisonville
Sweetwater High School, Sweetwater
Tellico Plains High School, Tellico Plains

Montgomery County

Fort Campbell High School, Fort Campbell
The Fort Campbell Army base straddles the Kentucky-Tennessee border. The school is physically located in Tennessee, but is not a member of the Tennessee Secondary School Athletic Association, the state's governing body for interscholastic activities. It is instead a member of the Kentucky High School Athletic Association. Most of the base housing is in Kentucky, the school was originally on the Kentucky side of the base, and it is operated by the Kentucky District of the U.S. Department of Defense Domestic Dependent Elementary and Secondary Schools, along with all other schools on Fort Campbell and the schools on the Fort Knox base situated entirely in Kentucky.
Montgomery Central High School, Cunningham

Clarksville

Clarksville Academy
Clarksville Christian School
Clarksville High School
Kenwood High School
Middle College HS @ APSU
Northeast High School
Northwest High School
Rossview High School
West Creek High School

Moore County
Moore County High School, Lynchburg

Morgan County

Wartburg-Central High School, Wartburg
Coalfield School, Coalfield
Oakdale High School, Oakdale
Sunbright High School, Sunbright

Obion County

Obion County Central High School, Troy
South Fulton High School, South Fulton
Union City High School, Union City

Overton County
Livingston Academy, Livingston

Perry County
Perry County High School, Linden

Pickett County
Pickett County High School, Byrdstown

Polk County

Copper Basin High School, Copperhill
Polk County High School, Benton

Putnam County

Cookeville High School, Cookeville
Upperman High School, Baxter

Monterey

Heritage Academy
Monterey High School

Rhea County

Rhea County High School, Evensville
Rhea County Academy, Dayton

Roane County

Harriman High School, Harriman
Oliver Springs High School, Oliver Springs
Rockwood High School, Rockwood

Kingston

Midway High School
Roane County High School

Robertson County

Jo Byrns High School, Cedar Hill
East Robertson High School, Cross Plains
Springfield High School, Springfield
White House Heritage High School, White House

Greenbrier

Dayspring Academy
Greenbrier High School

Rutherford County

Eagleville K-12 School, Eagleville
La Vergne High School, La Vergne
Rockvale High School, Rockvale

Murfreesboro

Blackman High School
Central Magnet School
Daniel McKee Alternative School
Franklin Road Christian School
Holloway High School
Middle Tennessee Christian School
Oakland High School
Riverdale High School
Siegel High School

Smyrna

Lancaster Christian Academy
Smyrna High School
Smyrna West Alternative School 
Stewarts Creek High School

Scott County
Oneida High School, Oneida

Huntsville

Huntsville High School
Scott High School

Sequatchie County
Sequatchie County High School, Dunlap

Sevier County

Gatlinburg-Pittman High School, Gatlinburg
Northview Academy, Kodak
Pigeon Forge High School, Pigeon Forge

Sevierville

Parkway Academy
Sevier County High School

Seymour

King's Academy
Seymour High School
Seymour Christian School

Shelby County

Bartlett High School, Bartlett
Millington Central High School, Millington
Tipton Rosemark Academy, Rosemark

Arlington

Arlington High School
Bolton High School

Collierville

Collierville High School
St. George's Independent Schools

Cordova

Cordova High School
Saint Benedict at Auburndale

Germantown

Germantown High School
Houston High School

Memphis

Public

Booker T. Washington High School
Central High School
Craigmont High School
Douglass High School
East High School
Fairley High School
Hamilton High School
Hillcrest High School
Kingsbury High School
Kirby High School
Manassas High School
Melrose High School
Mitchell High School
Oakhaven High School
Overton High School
Raleigh-Egypt High School
Ridgeway High School
Sheffield High School
Shelby Training Center, Memphis
Trezevant High School
Westwood High School
White Station High School
Whitehaven High School
Wooddale High School

Private

Briarcrest Christian School
Christian Brothers High School
The Collegiate School of Memphis
Concord Academy
Evangelical Christian School
First Assembly Christian School
Harding Academy
Hutchison School
Immaculate Conception Cathedral High School
Lausanne Collegiate School
Macon Road Baptist School
Margolin Hebrew Academy
Memphis Catholic High School
Memphis Jewish High School
Memphis University School
Middle College High School
St. Agnes Academy-St. Dominic School
St. Mary's Episcopal School
Westminster Academy

Smith County

Gordonsville High School, Gordonsville
Smith County High School, Carthage

Stewart County
Stewart County High School, Dover

Sullivan County

Dobyns Bennett High School, Kingsport
Sullivan East High School, Bluff City

Bristol

Bristol Tennessee High School
Mountain Empire Baptist School

Blountville

Tri-Cities Christian Academy
West Ridge High School

Sumner County

Westmoreland High School, Westmoreland
White House High School, White House

Gallatin

Gallatin High School
Station Camp High School

Hendersonville

Beech Senior High School
Hendersonville Christian Academy
Hendersonville High School
Merrol Hyde Magnet School
Pope John Paul II High School

Portland

Highland Academy
Portland High School

Tipton County

Brighton High School, Brighton
Covington High School, Covington
Munford High School, Munford

Trousdale County
Trousdale County High School, Hartsville

Unicoi County
Unicoi County High School, Erwin

Union County
Union County High School, Maynardville

Van Buren County
Van Buren County High School, Spencer

Warren County

McMinnville

F.C. Boyd Christian School
Warren County High School

Washington County

Daniel Boone High School, Gray
David Crockett High School, Jonesborough

Johnson City

Science Hill High School
University School

Wayne County

Collinwood High School, Collinwood
Frank Hughes School, Clifton
Wayne County High School, Waynesboro

Weakley County

Dresden High School, Dresden
Gleason High School, Gleason
Greenfield High School, Greenfield
Sharon School, Sharon
Westview High School, Martin

White County
White County High School, Sparta

Williamson County

Fairview High School, Fairview
Fred J. Page High School, Rudderville (Franklin mailing address)
Independence High School, Thompson's Station
Nolensville High School, Nolensville
Summit High School, Spring Hill

Brentwood

Brentwood Academy
Brentwood High School
Ravenwood High School

Franklin

Battle Ground Academy
Centennial High School
Franklin High School
Renaissance High School, Franklin

Wilson County
Watertown High School, Watertown

Lebanon

Friendship Christian School
Lebanon High School

Mount Juliet

Green Hill High School
Mount Juliet Christian Academy
Mount Juliet High School
Wilson Central High School

See also
List of school districts in Tennessee

Notes

Tennessee
High schools